Andreas Öhman (born 14 January 1998) is a Swedish footballer who plays for Västra Frölunda as a midfielder.

References

External links 
 

Swedish footballers
Sweden youth international footballers
1998 births
Living people
IFK Göteborg players
Utsiktens BK players
Västra Frölunda IF players
Allsvenskan players
Ettan Fotboll players
Association football midfielders